The Joseph P. Addabbo Memorial Bridge (formerly the North Channel Bridge) is a bridge that carries Cross Bay Boulevard across Jamaica Bay in Queens, New York City, between Howard Beach and Broad Channel. The fixed bridge, carrying six lanes of Cross Bay Boulevard, is named for the late Joseph P. Addabbo, who represented the area in the United States House of Representatives from 1961 to 1986.

The bridge was built alongside the original North Channel Bridge (1925-1993) as a replacement; a lack of maintenance on the old bascule bridge had allowed it to deteriorate to the point where it was beyond repair.

References

External links

Transportation Alternatives

Bridges in Queens, New York
Transportation in Rockaway, Queens
Road bridges in New York City
Pedestrian bridges in New York City
Howard Beach, Queens